Paul Raymond Burke (July 21, 1926 – September 13, 2009) was an American actor, best known for his lead roles in two 1960s ABC television series, Naked City and 12 O'Clock High. He was twice nominated for an Emmy Award for his portrayal of New York Police Department detective Adam Flint in Naked City.

Life and career

Burke was born in New Orleans, the son of Santa Maria (née Palermo) and Martin Joseph "Marty" Burke, a boxer who fought Gene Tunney and later owned a restaurant and nightclub known as Marty Burke's in the New Orleans French Quarter.

After training at the Pasadena Playhouse, Burke's film career began with a small role in the movie Golden Girl. Early in his career, Burke guest-starred in the syndicated series Highway Patrol and Men of Annapolis. In 1956–57, Burke was cast as Dr. Noah McCann in Noah's Ark, a weekly program produced by Jack Webb which aired on NBC, the story of a pair of dedicated veterinarians. Victor Rodman played the older colleague, Dr. Sam Rinehart.

In the 1957–58 season, Burke appeared as Jeff Kittridge in five episodes of Barry Sullivan's adventure/drama series, Harbormaster. Burke also guest-starred on episodes of The Lone Ranger, Tightrope, Dragnet, Adventures of Superman, The Man and the Challenge, and M Squad. In the 1959–60 season, he appeared as Robertson in the NBC espionage series Five Fingers, starring with David Hedison.

After Five Fingers Burke was cast in the lead role of the police show Naked City, in which he appeared as Adam Flint from 1960 to 1963. Burke then appeared in the starring role of Captain (later Maj., then Col.) Joe Gallagher on 12 O'Clock High between 1964 and 1967, during which time he met his wife, Lyn. The 12 O'Clock High role was Burke's last lead television role.

In 1967, Burke starred in the film Valley of the Dolls as Lyon Burke, the young lawyer who befriended all three female stars and had a tempestuous relationship with Anne Welles. He also played a police officer who pursued a bank thief played by Steve McQueen in The Thomas Crown Affair.

During the 1970s he appeared in three episodes each of ABC's The Love Boat and CBS's Medical Center. In 1984, he appeared as C.C. Capwell in 21 episodes of the NBC soap opera Santa Barbara. He appeared in supporting roles in a number of television series, including recurring roles in Dynasty from 1982 to 1988 and in Tom Selleck's Magnum, P.I., from 1981 to 1985 as Rear Admiral Hawkes. Burke also served as a television commercial spokesman for the electronics retailer RadioShack.

Racketeering charges
In 1989 Burke and Harry Connick Sr., New Orleans district attorney, were indicted on racketeering charges for aiding and abetting a gambling operation by returning gambling records to an arrested gambler. They were both acquitted of the charges.

Later years and death
Burke was the grandfather of actress Alia Shawkat, whose mother is Burke's daughter, Dina. He retired from acting in the early 1990s. Suffering from leukemia and non-Hodgkin's lymphoma, he died in 2009 at his home in Palm Springs, California, aged 83. His second wife, Lyn Peters, died in Palm Springs on September 10, 2013, at the age of 72.

Filmography

References

External links

"Star With a Wall Around Him," TV Guide, May 1962

1926 births
2009 deaths
20th-century American male actors
American male film actors
American male television actors
Deaths from cancer in California
Deaths from leukemia
Deaths from non-Hodgkin lymphoma
Male actors from New Orleans
Male actors from Palm Springs, California